Victory Monument ( also known as Ulus Atatürk Anıtı) is a monument in Ankara, Turkey.

Geography
The monument is in the Ulus Square which was the main square in Ankara before the 1950s. It is situated to the east of Atatürk Boulevard.

History
The monument was a result of a nationwide fund drive organized by the journalist Yunus Nadi. After an international competition, the project of Heinrich Krippel from Austria was rewarded. The monument was inaugurated on 24 November 1927. It was restored in 2002.

Technical details
The monument is actually a group of bronze statues. In addition to equestrian Atatürk in the center, there are three more figures; two soldiers and one woman. One soldier is calling his friend to the battlefront and the other one is observing the front. The woman is carrying a cannonball, as a reference to the contributions of the Turkish women during the Turkish War of Independence.

See also
Atatürk monuments and memorials

References

1927 in Turkey
1927 sculptures
Buildings and structures completed in 1927
Ankara
Monuments and memorials in Ankara
Equestrian statues in Turkey
Bronze sculptures in Turkey
Buildings and structures in Ankara
Culture in Ankara
Tourist attractions in Ankara
Ulus, Ankara
Monuments and memorials to the Turkish War of Independence